Ian Turner (born in Warwick, Queensland on 28 May 1970) is an Australian businessman and former rugby league footballer.

Turner was a Brisbane Broncos scholarship player in 1991, in conjunction with Brothers RLFC, coming from Runaway Bay RLFC after Colts Group 18 Grand Final Win. He was a member Souths RLFC for most of his career. He played in the centres and back row. Turner signed with the Super League for the 1995–96 season playing for French team Paris Saint-Germain in the first Super League match world wide at Stade Sébastien Charléty in Paris against the Sheffield Eagles. He also played with Union Treiziste Catalane. A season-ending neck injury saw him return to Australia playing again for Souths RLFC taking the season's top try scorer award in 1997 and named in the team of the decade, before signing for Wynnum Manly Seagulls for seasons 1998 and 1999 in the Queensland Cup.

Turner also represented Queensland in OzTag playing in two State of Origin Series after retiring from rugby league.

Turner is still actively involved with Queensland Rugby League. He is a Director of two national construction supply companies National Construction Supply Companies (Nexgen Construction Supplies and Hydro International)  that sponsor Souths Logan RLFC and Wynumn RLFC

References 

1970 births
Living people
Australian expatriate sportspeople in France
Australian rugby league players
Australian expatriate rugby league players
Paris Saint-Germain Rugby League players
Past Brothers players
Souths Logan Magpies players
Expatriate rugby league players in France
Rugby league centres
Rugby league players from Queensland
Wynnum Manly Seagulls players